The qualification group 6 for the 2010 European Men's Handball Championship included the national teams of Czech Republic, France, Latvia, Luxembourg and Portugal. France and the Czech Republic qualified to the final tournament.

Standings

Fixtures and results

References
 EHF Euro Events – Men's EURO 2010 (qualification)

Qualification, Group 6